Frank Charles Barnaby (27 September 1927 – 1 August 2020) was the Nuclear Issues Consultant to the Oxford Research Group, a freelance defence analyst, and a prolific author on military technology. He was based in the United Kingdom.

He was born in Andover, Hampshire, and was educated at Andover Grammar School and the University of London.

Barnaby trained as a nuclear physicist and worked at the Atomic Weapons Research Establishment, Aldermaston, between 1951 and 1957. He was on the senior scientific staff of the Medical Research Council (UK) when a university lecturer at University College London (1957–1967).

Barnaby was Director of the Stockholm International Peace Research Institute (SIPRI) from 1971–1981. In 1981, Barnaby became a founding member of the World Cultural Council. He was a professor at the VU University Amsterdam 1981–85, and awarded the Harold Stassen Chair of International Relations at the University of Minnesota in 1985. He has been the Executive Secretary of the Pugwash Conferences on Science and World Affairs.

He was married and has a son and a daughter.

He died on 1 August 2020 at the age of 92.

Works
The nuclear future (Fabian Society, 1969)
Man and the Atom (Minerva, 1971)
Nuclear proliferation and the South African threat (1977)
Future Warfare (Michael Joseph, 1986)
Star Wars (Fourth Estate, 1987)
The Automated Battlefield (Sidgwick & Jackson, 1987)
The Invisible Bomb (Tauris, 1989)
The Gaia Peace Atlas (Pan, 1989)
A Handbook of Verification Procedures (editor - Palgrave Macmillan, 1990)
The Role and Control of Military Force in the 1990s (1992)
How to Build a Nuclear Bomb: And Other Weapons of Mass Destruction  (Granta, 2003)  
The Future of Terror (Granta, 2007) 
Prospects for Peace (Pergamon, 2013) 
How Nuclear Weapons Spread: Nuclear-Weapon Proliferation in the 1990s (Routledge, 2016)

References

External links
Parents of the Field of Peace and Conflict Studies: Frank Barnaby
Consequences of a Nuclear Renaissance
Too Hot to Handle?: The Future of Civil Nuclear Power

People associated with nuclear power
British anti–nuclear weapons activists
Academics of University College London
University of Minnesota faculty
Founding members of the World Cultural Council
People from Andover, Hampshire
1927 births
2020 deaths